{{Infobox football club
| clubname = Vitória de Guimarães
| image = Vitória Guimarães.svg
| upright = 0.7
| fullname = Vitória Sport Clube
| nickname = Os Vimaranenses (The ones from Guimarães)Os Conquistadores (The Conquerors)| founded = 
| ground = Estádio D. Afonso Henriques
| capacity = 30,146
| chairman = António Miguel Cardoso
| manager = Moreno
| league = Primeira Liga
| season = 2021–22
| position = Primeira Liga, 6th of 18
| website = http://www.vitoriasc.pt/
| current = 2022–23 Vitória S.C. season
| pattern_la1 = _vitoriasc2223h
| pattern_b1 = _vitoriasc2223h
| pattern_ra1 = _vitoriasc2223h
| pattern_sh1 = _vitoriasc2223h
| pattern_so1 = 
| leftarm1 = FFFFFF
| body1 = FFFFFF
| rightarm1 = FFFFFF
| shorts1 = FFFFFF
| socks1 = FFFFFF
| pattern_la2 = _guimaraes2021a
| pattern_b2 = _guimaraes2021a
| pattern_ra2 = _guimaraes2021a
| pattern_sh2 = _guimaraes2021h
| pattern_so2 = _whitetop
| leftarm2 = 000000
| body2 = 000000
| rightarm2 = 000000
| shorts2 = 000000
| socks2 = 000000
| pattern_la3 = 
| pattern_b3 = 
| pattern_ra3 = 
| pattern_sh3 = 
| pattern_so3 = 
| leftarm3 = 
| body3 = 
| rightarm3 = 
| shorts3 = 
| socks3 = 
| owner = V Sports (Nassef Sawiris & Wes Edens) (46%)
}}

Vitória Sport Clube, commonly known as Vitória de Guimarães, is a Portuguese professional football club based in Guimarães that competes in the Primeira Liga, the top-flight of football in Portugal.

Vitória de Guimarães have finished third in the Primeira Liga on four occasions, most recently in 2007–08. They have won one Taça de Portugal (2013) and one Supertaça Cândido de Oliveira (1988), while also being runners-up of the former on six occasions.

The club have competed regularly in European competitions, where their best finish was the quarter-finals of the 1986–87 UEFA Cup.

History
Vitória was formed in 1922. Its name seems to be a tribute to Vitória de Setúbal, which at the time was a top contender for the Campeonato de Portugal, though these days Guimarães supporters downplay the connection. After seasons of toiling in the Braga FA leagues, the Vimaranenses were first promoted to the Primeira Liga in 1941, and two seasons later battled the Sadinos from Setúbal for the first time in the League. Surprise package Guimarães, against all odds, reached their first Taça de Portugal final in their debut season, but lost to Belenenses 2–0.

Vitória's furthest progress in a European tournament was in the 1986–87 UEFA Cup, in which they were defeated 5–2 on aggregate in the quarter-finals by West German club Borussia Mönchengladbach.

In the early 2000s, Vitória struggled in some years to retain its status in the top Portuguese division, then named the Superliga. Those years were marked by the decline of the leadership of Pimenta Machado, former club president, who was accused on charges of embezzlement. In February 2008 he was sentenced to four years and three months of prison on a suspended sentence, though a year later he was cleared of this charge and instead ordered to pay a €4,000 fine for falsifying a document.

Despite this, in 2004–05, the club secured a fifth-place finish in the league and qualified for European competition via the UEFA Cup. The next season (2005–06), however, they were relegated to the Segunda Liga (where they last played in 1958) after finishing 17th in the Superliga, despite reaching the Taça de Portugal semi-final, having beaten Benfica in the quarter-finals. The club also failed to progress from their UEFA Cup group, as eventual winners Sevilla, Premier League outfit Bolton Wanderers and Russian team Zenit Saint Petersburg progressed.

Vitória bounced back immediately to the top-flight as runners-up to Leixões S.C. under the management of Manuel Cajuda. A joint-best third-place finish in 2007–08, guaranteeing them a place in the third qualifying round of the 2008–09 UEFA Champions League, their first such campaign. There they fell to Swiss side FC Basel 2–1 on aggregate, with a potential away goal winner by Roberto Calmon Félix being ruled out late on for offside. Vitória dropped into the 2008–09 UEFA Cup first round as a result of their elimination, and lost 4–2 on aggregate after extra time to England's Portsmouth.

Led by Rui Vitória in 2012–13, Vitória found themselves in financial problems, which caused them to lose many experienced players and bet on young players. However, they would go on to win their first Taça de Portugal title after previously losing five finals. Vitória beat rivals Braga en route to the final, where they recovered from 1–0 down against Benfica to win 2–1.

In 2017, Vitória made the cup final again, losing 2–1 to double winners S.L. Benfica.  That September, the team left their mark in UEFA competitions, being the first team to start a game without a European player on the field. In 2020–21, the club went through four managers – Tiago, João Henriques, Bino and Moreno – before finishing seventh, missing Europe by one place.

In February 2023, Vitória announced an agreement to sell 46% of the club's shares in a deal worth €5m to football club holding company V Sports, led by billionaires Nassef Sawiris and Wes Edens: owners of Premier League club Aston Villa. V Sports would additionally offer a credit line of up to €20m, and invest an additional €2m into sporting infrastructure. The agreement was approved at a vote of Vitória's members on 4 March 2023: approximately 88% voted in favour of the deal. The deal will be formalised on 14 April.

Stadium
They play in the Estádio D. Afonso Henriques, which has a capacity of just over 30,000.

After Os Três Grandes, Vitória is the club which attracts most supporters to the stadium, with average attendances of 20,000 per game. Vitória usually has a higher average than all the other clubs, even when the club played in the Second Division/League.

Honours
Taça de Portugal
Winners: 2012–13Runners-up (6): 1941–42, 1962–63, 1975–76, 1987–88, 2010–11, 2016–17

Supertaça Cândido de Oliveira
Winners: 1988Runners-up:'' 2011, 2013, 2017

League and Cup history
Updated: May 2021.
The club's 76 seasons (as in 2021) in the top level of Portuguese football make them the club with the joint-fourth longest time there, after Benfica, Porto, and Sporting CP  (all with 87); and Belenenses with 77.

European matches

Players

Current squad

Out on loan

Club staff

Basketball

Vitória S.C. men's basketball team plays in the LPB.

Volleyball

Vitória Sport Clube has a volleyball team which plays in the Portuguese Volleyball League A1.

References

External links

Guimaraes info at zerozero.pt

 
Football clubs in Portugal
Association football clubs established in 1922
1922 establishments in Portugal
Taça de Portugal winners
Primeira Liga clubs
Liga Portugal 2 clubs